Nişancı Ahmed Pasha (died February 1753), also called Şehla Ahmed Pasha or Hacı Şehla Ahmed Pasha or Kör Vezir Ahmed Pasha ("Ahmed Pasha the Blind Vizier"), was an Ottoman Grand Vizier during the reign of Mahmud I. He was also the Ottoman governor of Egypt from 1748 to 1751.

Early life 
His family was from Alaiye (now Alanya in Antalya Province, Turkey), but Ahmed was born in Söke (in Aydın Province, Turkey) to his father Cafer. One of his uncles was a vizier. He was appointed as the chief stableman. In 1738, he was promoted to be the governor of Aydın Province. In 1742, he returned to Constantinople, the capital. He was appointed as the nişancı (one of the highest bureaucratic posts). Soon afterwards, he was promoted to be the grand vizier on 23 June 1740.

He was sometimes called Kör Vezir ("blind vizier") because he was somewhat cross-eyed.

As Grand Vizier 
His term in the office was one of the few periods of peace in the history of the Ottoman Empire, as the war against the Habsburg monarchy and the Russian Empire had just ended and Nader Shah of Persia was occupied in Transoxiana and Daghestan. Despite the favorable conditions, Ahmed Pasha was unable to take advantage of the political state of peace and failed to follow his intended program of recovery and reform. Meanwhile, he was accused of dishonesty and indifference to state affairs. He was dismissed from the post on 21 April 1742 and was replaced by the more experienced Hekimoğlu Ali Pasha, who had already once served a term as grand vizier 10 years ago.

Later years 
He was exiled to the island of Rhodes. Soon thereafter, however, he returned to government services. In 1743, he became the governor of the Sanjak of İçel (modern Mersin Province, Turkey) and then the governor of Sidon Eyalet. After the beginning of the new phase of the war against Persia, he was tasked with commanding the northern portion of the front, where he successfully defended Kars (in modern Turkey). He then worked as the governor of Aleppo Eyalet (in modern Syria) and Diyarbekir Eyalet.

After the Treaty of Kerden, he was appointed the governor of Baghdad Eyalet in 1747, the governor of Egypt Eyalet in 1748, and the governor of Adana Eyalet in 1751. However, Ahmed Pasha refused this last position in Adana, and in 1752, he returned to his former governorship in Aleppo, where he died in February 1753.

Interests
Contemporaries in Ottoman Egypt described him as a man interested in the sciences and philosophy, but reported that he was disappointed when he discovered that Egypt's famed Al-Azhar University had ceased to teach about sciences and focused on only religious education. Reportedly, he found even the most educated Egyptians and ulema to be illiterate in basic mathematics, spending most of his time with the few he found that shared his interest in the sciences.

See also 
 List of Ottoman grand viziers
 List of Ottoman governors of Egypt

References 

1753 deaths
18th-century Grand Viziers of the Ottoman Empire
18th-century Ottoman governors of Egypt
Pashas
Nişancı
Year of birth unknown
Ottoman governors of Egypt
Ottoman governors of Aleppo